Otto W. Kanturek (27 July 1897, Vienna – 26 June 1941, Cawston, Norfolk) was an Austrian, later Czechoslovak cameraman, cinematographer and film director.

Life
Having trained at the Graphischen Lehr- und Versuchsanstalt in Vienna and, after a voluntary internship for Gaumont Newsreels, he became an assistant film cameraman with them in 1912 and the following year received a post with producer Erich Pommer in Paris, filming newsreels for Pathé, Gaumont and Éclair. In 1914 he went to Milan to work for Milano-Film, then in 1915 to work with Sascha-Film in Vienna and with Alexander Korda in Budapest. During the First World War, he made his debut as chief cameraman and in 1916 he was conscripted and was seconded to the special photographic services in the military.

In 1920 he moved to Berlin and spent the 1920s working on several films, including Fritz Lang's Frau im Mond. After the Nazis seized power in Germany in 1933, he left Germany for Vienna and Prague, where he directed the film Das Glück von Grinzing. In 1933, by then a Czechoslovak citizen, he came to London, where he finally settled and continued his work as a cameraman, including on Blossom Time (known in German as Du bist mein Herz) with Richard Tauber. He also worked as a director on the romantic comedy The Student's Romance. 

He died at Cawston, Norfolk, during the Second World War whilst filming the aerial shots for A Yank in the RAF from an Avro Anson, when it collided with a Hawker Hurricane. He left a widow, Edith Maria Lucia Beatrix, who was then living at St John's Wood, London.

Filmography

References

External links

1897 births
1941 deaths
Austrian film directors
Austrian cinematographers
Austrian civilians killed in World War II
Victims of aviation accidents or incidents in England
Victims of aviation accidents or incidents in 1941